Druon may refer to:
 Druon (wasp), a genus of cynipid wasps
 Druon Antigoon, Flemish folkloric character
 Loïc Druon, French footballer
 Maurice Druon, French novelist
 Saint Drogo, also known as Saint Druon, Flemish saint